I Cover the Waterfront is a 1933 American Pre-Code romantic drama film directed by James Cruze and starring Ben Lyon, Claudette Colbert, Ernest Torrence, and Hobart Cavanaugh.

Based on the book, by Max Miller, a reporter for the San Diego Sun, the film is about a reporter who investigates a waterfront smuggling operation, and becomes romantically involved with the daughter of the man he is investigating.

Plot
San Diego Standard reporter H. Joseph Miller (Ben Lyon) has been covering the city's waterfront for the past five years and is fed up with the work. He longs to escape the waterfront life and land a newspaper job back East so he can marry his Vermont sweetheart. Miller is frustrated by the lack of progress of his current assignment investigating the smuggling of Chinese into the country by a fisherman named Eli Kirk (Ernest Torrence). One morning after wasting a night tracking down bad leads, his editor at the Standard orders him to investigate a report of a girl swimming naked at the beach. There he meets Julie Kirk (Claudette Colbert), the daughter of the man he's been investigating.

Meanwhile, Eli Kirk and his crew are returning to San Diego with a Chinese passenger when the Coast Guard approaches. Not wanting to be caught with evidence of his smuggling operation, Kirk orders his men to weigh down the Chinese man and lower him overboard to his death. The Coast Guard, accompanied by Miller, board the boat but find nothing. The next day, Miller discovers the man's body which was carried in with the tide, and takes it as evidence to his editor, who still remains skeptical of Kirk's guilt. To get conclusive evidence, Miller tells him he plans to romance Kirk's daughter Julie in order to break the smuggling operation.

When Kirk returns, he informs Julie that they will need to move on soon—maybe to Singapore—as soon as he can put together enough money for the voyage. One night, Julie discovers her father drunk at a boarding house. Miller, who was there investigating Kirk, helps Julie take her father home. Julie does not discourage Miller's flirtations, and during the next few weeks they fall in love. She is able to help Miller see the beauty of the waterfront, and inspires him to improve the novel he's been working for the past five years. While visiting an old Spanish galleon on a date, he playfully restrains her in a torture rack and kisses her passionately—and she returns his passion.

Julie and Miller spend a romantic evening together on the beach, where she reveals that she and her father will be sailing away in the next few days. After spending the night in Miller's apartment, Julie announces the next morning that she's decided to stay, hoping that he will stay with her. When Miller learns from her that her father is due to dock at the Chinese settlement that night, he notifies the Coast Guard. At the dock, while the Coast Guard searches the vessel, Miller discovers a Chinese man hidden inside a large shark. When the Coast Guard attempt to arrest Kirk, he flees the scene but is wounded during his escape.

The next morning, Miller's breaking story is published on the Standard'''s front page. When a wounded Kirk makes his way back home, Julie learns that it was Miller who helped the Coast Guard uncover her father's smuggling operation (of which she was unaware), and that she unknowingly revealed to him his landing location. Soon after, Miller, feeling guilty over the story's impact to Julie's life, arrives at her home and apologizes for the hurt he's caused her, and announces that he loves her. Feeling used by his actions, an angry Julie sends him away. Later that night, Miller locates Kirk, who shoots him in the arm. Julie arrives to help her father escape, and seeing Miller wounded, she tells her father she cannot leave Miller to die. Seeing that she loves him, Kirk helps her take Miller to safety, after which Kirk dies. Later from his hospital bed, Miller acknowledges in his newspaper column that Kirk saved his life before he died. Sometime later, Miller returns to his apartment, where Julie is waiting to greet him. Noticing that she cleaned and transformed his place into a cozy home, he tells her he finally wrote the ending to his novel, "He marries the girl". Julie acknowledges, "That's a swell finish", and the two embrace.

Cast

 Ben Lyon as H. Joseph Miller 
 Claudette Colbert as Julie Kirk 
 Ernest Torrence as Eli Kirk, Julie's father 
 Hobart Cavanaugh as McCoy 
 Maurice Black as Ortegus, Kirk's first mate
 Purnell Pratt as John Phelps, Miller's editor 
 Harry Beresford as Old Chris, the salvage man 
 Wilfred Lucas as Randall, the Coast Guard officer

Production

Screenplay
Rights to the novel were bought by Edward Small and his partner Harry Goets in 1932. They made it through the Reliance Picture Corporation as the first of a six-film deal with United Artists. Reliance co-produced the film with Joseph Schenck's Art Cinema Corporation.

FilmingI Cover the Waterfront was filmed from mid-February to early March 1933.

Soundtrack
The film's title song, "I Cover the Waterfront", appears in the film only as an instrumental. Written by Johnny Green and Edward Heyman, the song went on to become a jazz standard recorded by many artists, including Billie Holiday, Louis Armstrong, Frank Sinatra, The Ink Spots, and Ella Fitzgerald, among others.

Critical response
In his review for The New York Times, film critic Mordaunt Hall called the film "a stolid and often grim picture". While Hall felt the drama was not as good as some of director James Cruze's previous work, the "clever acting of the principals"—especially that of Ernest Torrence—offset some of the film's shortcomings. Hall found some of the scenes "more shocking than suspenseful" and felt a broader adaptation of Max Miller's book may have been more interesting than the focus on the melodramatic series of incidents related to a sinister fisherman. While acknowledging that "Colbert does well as Julie", Hall did not find her convincing as a fisherman's daughter because she does not look the type. Hall reserved his highest praise for Ernest Torrence in his final screen performance. Torrence died on May 15, 1933, shortly after the film was completed.

John Mosher of The New Yorker described the adaptation as a "commonplace screen romance," but also praised the performance of the late Torrence, writing that he "was at the height of his power ... One can foresee that many pictures will be empty things for lack of him." Variety said: "Rather than an adaption of the Max Miller book, this is a homemade studio yarn carrying the original’s title", calling it "a moderately entertaining picture ... The late Ernest Torrence has the meat part and his performance is in keeping with the standard he had set for himself. A pretty tough assignment they gave him, one in which it was necessary to capture sympathy in face of the worst sort of opposition from the script. He'll be sorely missed on the screen."

RemakesI Cover the Waterfront was remade in 1961 by Edward Small as Secret of Deep Harbor''.

See also
List of films in the public domain in the United States

References

External links

 
 
 
 
 I Cover the Waterfront (script)

1933 films
1933 romantic drama films
American black-and-white films
American romantic drama films
1930s English-language films
Films about journalists
Films based on American novels
Films directed by James Cruze
Films produced by Edward Small
Films scored by Alfred Newman
Films set in San Diego
United Artists films
1930s American films